

Gmina Ziębice is an urban-rural gmina (administrative district) in Ząbkowice Śląskie County, Lower Silesian Voivodeship, in south-western Poland.

Neighbouring gminas
Gmina Ziębice is bordered by the gminas of Ciepłowody, Kamieniec Ząbkowicki, Kamiennik, Otmuchów, Paczków, Przeworno, Strzelin and Ząbkowice Śląskie.

Villages
Apart from the town of Ziębice, the gmina contains the villages of Biernacice, Bożnowice, Brukalice, Czerńczyce, Dębowiec, Głęboka, Henryków, Jasienica, Kalinowice Dolne, Kalinowice Górne, Krzelków, Lipa, Lubnów, Niedźwiednik, Niedźwiedź, Nowina, Nowy Dwór, Osina Mała, Osina Wielka, Pomianów Dolny, Raczyce, Rososznica, Skalice, Służejów, Starczówek, Wadochowice, Wigancice and Witostowice.

Twin towns – sister cities

Gmina Ziębice is twinned with:
 Brighton, United States
 Ebreichsdorf, Austria
 Jaroměř, Czech Republic

References

Ziebice
Ząbkowice Śląskie County